= 300ER =

300ER may refer to:

- Boeing 767-300ER, aircraft variant
- Boeing 777-300ER, aircraft variant
